Walter Lyon (April 27, 1853 – March 21, 1933) was an American lawyer and politician who served as the sixth lieutenant governor of Pennsylvania as a Republican from 1895 to 1899.

Lyon was born in Shaler Township, Pennsylvania. He was educated at the Wakeam Academy and was admitted to the bar as an attorney in 1876. In 1889, he was appointed as United States District Attorney for the Western District of Pennsylvania. He resigned from this position in 1893 to run for Pennsylvania State Senate; he served in this body for one term until his election as Lieutenant Governor. After leaving politics, he founded the Pittsburgh law firm of Lyon, Hunter & Burke. He later retired to Sewickley, Pennsylvania.

References

1853 births
1933 deaths
Republican Party Pennsylvania state senators
Lieutenant Governors of Pennsylvania
People from Shaler Township, Pennsylvania
United States Attorneys for the Western District of Pennsylvania
19th-century American lawyers
20th-century American lawyers